Forte is a surname of Italian origin. Notable people with the surname include:

Allen Forte (1926–2014), American music theorist and musicologist
Anthony Forté or Rappin' 4-Tay (born 1968), rapper
Bruno Forte (born 1949), Italian theologian and ecclesiastic
Charles Forte, Baron Forte (1908–2007), hotelier
Daniele Forte (born 1990) Italian footballer
Dieter Forte (1935–2019), German author and playwright
Francesco Forte (1929–2022), Italian politician, academic and economist
John Forte (1918–1966) American comic book artist
John Forté (born 1975), filmmaker and musician best known for performing with the Fugees
Joe Forte, American writer and painter
Jonathan Forte (born 1986), English football player, playing for Notts County
Joseph Forte (born 1981), American professional basketball player
Julian Forte (born 1993), Jamaican sprinter
Matt Forté (born 1985), American football player
Rocco Forte (born 1945), son of Charles Forte, Baron Forte who inherited the hotel business
Stormie Forte, American lawyer, radio host, and politician
Will Forte (born 1970), Saturday Night Live comedian

Italian-language surnames